William Glenn Abbott (born February 16, 1951) is a former Major League Baseball (MLB) pitcher and former pitching coach for the Syracuse Mets. During an 11-year baseball career, he pitched for the Oakland Athletics (1973–76), Seattle Mariners (1977–81; 1983), and Detroit Tigers (1983–84). Abbott, along with Vida Blue, Paul Lindblad and Rollie Fingers combined for the first four-pitcher combined no-hitter in MLB history.

Professional career

Oakland Athletics
Abbott was drafted by the Oakland Athletics in the eighth round of the 1969 MLB Draft.

On September 28, 1975, Abbott pitched one inning of a no-hitter over the California Angels on the last day of the regular season, relieving Vida Blue, who threw the first five innings. Abbott retired Ike Hampton, Jerry Remy and Dave Chalk in order in the sixth inning before being replaced by Paul Lindblad and later Rollie Fingers. This was the first four-pitcher combined no-hitter in MLB history. He pitched four seasons with the Athletics going 13−16 with a 4.08 ERA in 73 games, 45 for starts.

Seattle Mariners
In November 1976, Abbott was drafted by the Seattle Mariners in the 1976 MLB expansion draft. He played for the Mariners longer than any other player from their original 1977 opening day roster. Abbott led all Mariners pitchers in wins in 1977 and 1980, winning 12 games in each of those seasons. Abbott said this about being chosen by the Mariners:

Abbott finished his career with the Mariners going 44−62 with a 4.54 ERA in 155 games, 146 for starts.

Detroit Tigers
On August 23, 1983, Abbott's contract was purchased by the Detroit Tigers from the Mariners for $100,000. In two seasons with the Tigers, Abbott was 2−2 with a 3.87 ERA in 20 games, 15 for starts before his release on August 14, 1984.

Coaching career
As listed below, Abbott has had a long career with many different stops as a minor league pitching coach.

1985: Little Falls.  1986-1987: Jackson Mets.  1990; 1993-1996: Huntsville Stars.  1991-1992: Tacoma Tigers.  1999: Midland RockHounds.   2000-2002: Modesto A's.  2003-2004: Oklahoma RedHawks.  2005: Spokane Indians.  2006: Mobile BayBears.  2007; 2010: San Antonio Missions.  2008-2009: Portland Beavers.  2011: Savannah Sand Gnats.  2012-2016: Binghamton Mets.   2017:  Binghamton Rumble Ponies. 2018: Las Vegas 51s. 2019: Syracuse Mets

Personal life 
Abbott was married to his wife Patti in 1971. They have three children: Todd, Jeff, and Amy.

References

External links

1951 births
Living people
Oakland Athletics players
Seattle Mariners players
Detroit Tigers players
Baseball players from Arkansas
Major League Baseball pitchers
Central Arkansas Bears baseball players
Coos Bay-North Bend A's players
Burlington Bees players
Birmingham A's players
Iowa Oaks players
Tucson Toros players
Salt Lake City Gulls players
Evansville Triplets players
Sportspeople from Little Rock, Arkansas
Minor league baseball coaches
Baseball coaches from Arkansas